Jonathan Rendall (11 June 1964 – c. 23 January 2013) was a British writer. He won the  Somerset Maugham Award.

Life
Rendall was born in Oxford and adopted as a baby. He lived his childhood in Ashtead, Surrey and much of his teenage years in Greece. He attended St John's School, Leatherhead, and Magdalen College, Oxford. He later lived in Ipswich, Suffolk.

Before becoming a writer, he acted as managerial advisor to the World Featherweight boxing champion, Colin "Sweet C" McMillan. He wrote articles for the magazines Esquire, Ring and Playboy, as well as writing three multi-award winning books.

Rendall starred in a three-part documentary entitled 'The Gambler', released by Channel 4. In it, he was given £12,000 of the broadcaster's money, chronicling the bets he placed on boxing, horse racing, slot-machines, and at the casino.

Rendall married Susie in 1988. The couple had three children together and separated in 2000.

On 23 January 2013, Rendall was discovered dead at his home in Ipswich.

Books by Rendall
 This Bloody Mary (Is the Last Thing I Own)
 Twelve Grand: The Gambler as Hero
 Garden Hopping:  Memoir of an Adoption
 Scream: The Tyson Tapes

References

 https://www.theguardian.com/books/2004/aug/24/top10s.boxing
 https://www.theguardian.com/books/2006/jul/30/1
 https://web.archive.org/web/20090307003423/http://www.thesweetscience.com/boxing-author.php?author=32
 https://www.independent.co.uk/sport/gambol-through-lifes-gamble-1079030.html

External links
http://www.newstatesman.com/books/2008/06/kasia-boddy-boxing-ali
https://www.theguardian.com/books/2004/aug/24/top10s.boxing
http://www.erasingclouds.com/wk2106garden.html
http://www.timesonline.co.uk/tol/comment/columnists/guest_contributors/article2337291.ece

Alumni of Magdalen College, Oxford
English writers
Boxing writers
People educated at St John's School, Leatherhead
People from Ashtead
1964 births
2013 deaths
English male writers